Sir Ian Leslie Orr-Ewing (4 June 1893 – 27 April 1958) was a British Conservative Party politician.

Orr-Ewing was born in Ayr, Scotland, the son of Charles Orr-Ewing, Member of Parliament (MP) for Ayr Burghs. He contested Gateshead in 1929. He was elected as Member of Parliament (MP) for Weston-super-Mare in the 1934 by-election after the resignation of Lord Erskine. He served as an MP until his death in April 1958, aged 64.

Orr-Ewing was knighted in the 1953 New Year Honours.

References
 Times Guide to the House of Commons, Times Newspapers Limited, 1935
 

1893 births
Conservative Party (UK) MPs for English constituencies
UK MPs 1931–1935
UK MPs 1935–1945
UK MPs 1945–1950
UK MPs 1950–1951
UK MPs 1951–1955
UK MPs 1955–1959
1958 deaths
Knights Bachelor